Ban Tan is a tambon (subdistrict) of Hot District, in Chiang Mai Province, Thailand. In 2019 it had a total population of 5,100 people.

Administration

Central administration
The tambon is subdivided into 10 administrative villages (muban).

Local administration
The whole area of the subdistrict is covered by the subdistrict municipality (Thesaban Tambon) Ban Tan (เทศบาลตำบลบ้านตาล).

References

External links
Thaitambon.com on Ban Tan

Tambon of Chiang Mai province
Populated places in Chiang Mai province